Komba is a Papuan language spoken in Morobe Province, Papua New Guinea.

References

Further reading
 
 

Languages of Morobe Province
Huon languages